Bleachery Water Treatment Plant is a historic water treatment plant located at Rock Hill, South Carolina.  It was built in 1930, and is a one-story brick building and filtration/purification facility in the Colonial Revival style. The city of Rock Hill passed a bond issue to build Bleachery Water Treatment Plant, to support the Rock Hill Printing and Finishing Company investment by M. Lowenstein Company of New York.

It was listed on the National Register of Historic Places in 2008.

References

Industrial buildings and structures on the National Register of Historic Places in South Carolina
Industrial buildings completed in 1930
Buildings and structures in Rock Hill, South Carolina
National Register of Historic Places in Rock Hill, South Carolina
Water treatment facilities